Alan Sachs is an executive producer, most well known as producer and co-creator of the TV series Welcome Back Kotter.  He formerly managed the band Unlocking the truth.

Disney
Alan Sacks produced a string of films for the Disney Channel, starting with Smart House in 1999.  He followed it up with the Emmy Award-winning The Color of Friendship in 2000.  He was executive producer of Camp Rock and Camp Rock 2: The Final Jam, starring Demi Lovato and the Jonas Brothers. He also produced the supervised television series Jonas. Among his other Disney Channel projects, they include The Other Me, Pixel Perfect, and You Wish!. In 2009, he produced the film Jonas Brothers: The 3D Concert Experience.

Television
Sacks helped develop and co-create Welcome Back, Kotter with Gabe Kaplan in 1975, based on Kaplan's stand-up routine about his high school buddies in Brooklyn. He also worked on Chico and The Man, a show created by Welcome Back, Kotter executive producer James Komack. In 1991, he created and produced a short-lived Saturday morning children's show built around the comedy and western band Riders In The Sky.

He produced a number of made-for-television movies in the 70's and 80's, including Women at West Point in 1979; Twirl in 1981; Rosie: The Rosemary Clooney Story in 1982; and A Cry for Love among others.

Film Projects
In 1984, after a project involving the band The Runaways imploded, he took the footage and incorporated it into a plot about a director working under the gun to finish a movie starring Joan Jett. The resulting film, Du-Beat-e-o, set against the backdrop of the then-burgeoning L.A. Hardcore Punk scene, starred Ray Sharkey and Derf Scratch of the band Fear.

In 1986, he wrote and produced the skateboarding film Thrashin' starring Josh Brolin, Robert Rusler, and Pamela Gidley. The film is notable for featuring a music performance by the original incarnation of the band Red Hot Chili Peppers.

Sacks also produced several documentaries, including Elko: The Cowboy Gathering, in 1994, and the video His Holiness the Dalai Lama: Compassion as a Source Of Happiness in 2007.

Theater
Sacks wrote, directed and co-produced the Off-Broadway production Lenny Bruce (In His Own Words)''.

Music
Sacks is former manager of the metal group Unlocking the Truth. He helped the group secure a six-album record deal with Sony Music worth upwards of $1.7 million.

Personal life
Alan Sacks currently resides in Los Angeles with his wife and youngest daughter. Along with producing, he was also a Professor Emeritus at Los Angeles Valley College. He taught classes on Film, TV, and Broadcasting until his retirement from teaching in 2007.

References

External links
 

American television producers
Living people
1943 births